Sir Alexander Robertson (3 February 1908 – 5 September 1990) was a Scottish veterinarian and administrator.

Life
Robertson was born on 3 February 1908 in Aberdeen, the youngest and only surviving child of Barbara Minty Strath and Alexander Robertson, a chauffeur and gardener. He was educated at Mackie Academy in Stonehaven.

He studied veterinary science at the University of Aberdeen, graduating with an MA in 1929 and a BSc in 1930. In 1937, he joined the staff of the Dick Vet Colletge in Edinburgh, as a lecturer in animal physiology, obtaining a doctorate (PhD) from the University of Edinburgh in 1940. From that year he was Professor of Animal Husbandry at the Dick Vet.

In 1946, he was elected a Fellow of the Royal Society of Edinburgh. His proposers were Alan William Greenwood, James Ebenezer Wilson, John Russell Greig and Donald Capell Matheson. He served as Vice President of the Society from 1969 to 1972.

In 1951, he became Professor of Animal Health at the University of Edinburgh.

He became a Commander of the Order of the British Empire (CBE) in 1963 and was knighted in 1970. In 1971 he received an honorary doctorate (LLD) from the University of Aberdeen.

He died in Edinburgh on 5 September 1990.

Recognition
A plaque to his memory was erected on Marischal College soon after his death.

Family
In 1936 he married Janet McKinlay (d.1988) and together they had two daughters.

Publications
Handbook of Tropical Veterinary Laboratory Diagnosis (1982)

References

1908 births
1990 deaths
People from Aberdeen
Academics of the University of Edinburgh
Alumni of the University of Aberdeen
British veterinarians
Commanders of the Order of the British Empire
Fellows of the Royal Society of Edinburgh
Knights Bachelor
Fellows of the Royal College of Veterinary Surgeons